Nancy Huang is an American poet.

Biography
Huang was born in Ohio and raised in Michigan. She moved to China when she was in 4th grade. Huang stayed in China for three years and then moved back to the United States. She received her B.A. in journalism from the University of Texas. 

Huang's first book, Favorite Daughter,  is divided into four segments that are roughly in regards to: immigration, Shanghai, America and assimilation. She worked on this project for two years before she entered it into the Write Bloody Poetry Book contest. The book won the 2016 Write Bloody Publishing Prize for poetry.

Awards 
 2015 YoungArts Finalist prize
 2016 Write Bloody Poetry Book contest 
 2017 Andrew Julius Gutow Academy of American Poets Prize 
 James F. Parker Award in Poetry 
 2018 Tin House Fellow
 VONA Fellow
 Pink Door Fellow
 Finalist in the Regent's Outstanding Arts & Humanities Award

References 

Living people
21st-century American poets
American women poets
English-language poets
21st-century American women writers
Year of birth missing (living people)